Winogradskyella aurantia is a Gram-negative, slightly halophilic and facultatively anaerobic bacterium from the genus of Winogradskyella which has been isolated from a marine solar saltern from Wendeng in China.

References

Flavobacteria
Bacteria described in 2018